Samir Diwakar Choughule (born 29 June 1973) is an actor and writer from Mumbai, India. A versatile actor, he is better known for his comedy roles, style and slapstick performance. From daily soaps to comedy shows, from theater plays to movies, Samir has acted in Marathi, Hindi and English shows. He is currently known for his role in "Maharashtrachi Hasyajatra" being telecasted on Sony Marathi.

Life and career
Choughule did his schooling in Shailendra Education Society and later completed his graduation from M L Dahanukar College of Commerce in 1993. He was interested in sports, but started acting after his acting adventures in school and college gave him success and encouragement. After completing his education, Samir worked in Mumbai and later took a full-time acting career in 2002. Since then has acted in various dramas, TV serials and movies. He is a team lead on Maharashtrachi Hasya Jatra comedy show.

Choughule is also a regular contributor to Saamana e-paper under the column "Fulora" where he writes about the various flavors of life.

Personal life 
Choughule grew up in Virar-Nallasopara area. He is married to Kavita and the couple lives in the same area.

Filmography
Samir has appeared in lead role as well as special appearance in a few Indian movies:

Theater work
Samir is an actor in Marathi Theater and below are a few plays where he has acted in:
 Asa Mi Asa Mi 
 Varya Varchi varat 
 Vyakti Ani Valli 
 Yada kadachit
 Chalre Bhoplya Tunuk Tunuk 
 Balak Palak 
 Shri Bai Samartha
 Carry On Heavens (Hinglish drama by Bharat Dabholkar)
 Best of Bottoms Up (English Drama)
Hyancha Kaay Karaaycha

TV appearances 
Samir has also acted in a few TV serials:
 Tikal te Political  (Political satire by Chandrakant Kulkarni) 
 Ambat God 
 Honar Sun Me Hya Gharchi  (Special appearance as Pappu) 
 Comedychi Bullet Train (Colors Marathi)
 Kunku 
 Aajke Shriman Shrimati  (Hindi TV Serial)
 Maharashtrachi Hasyajatra (Sony Marathi)
 Saare Tujhyachsathi (Sony Marathi)
 Assa Maher Nako Ga Baai! (Dhongi Baba)
 Post Office Ughade Aahe (Nirgudkar)

Awards and recognition
 Sanskruti kaladarpan Natya vibhag – 2016
 Zee Natya Gourav Puraskar 2015 – Best Comedy Actor for drama – Balak Palak

References

External links
 

1973 births
Living people
Male actors from Mumbai
21st-century Indian male actors
Indian male film actors
Indian male stage actors
Indian male television actors